Oleolophozia is a genus of liverworts belonging to the family Cephaloziellaceae.

The species of this genus are found in Europe and Russia.

Species:
 Oleolophozia perssonii (H.Buch & S.W.Arnell) L.Söderstr., De Roo & Hedd.

References

Jungermanniales
Jungermanniales genera